Varo may refer to:

People 
 Alberto Varo (born 1993), Spanish footballer
 Francisco Varo (1627–1687), Spanish Dominican friar, missionary in China, linguist
 Márton Váró (born 1943), Hungarian sculptor
 Remedios Varo (1908–1963), Spanish surrealist artist
 Varo Venturi (born 1956), Italian film director and musician

Places 
 Varo Island, Vanuatu
 Var River, in France

See also 
 Varro, a fictional species from the Star Trek: Voyager series featured in episode The Disease